The 1993 Canadian National Soccer League season was the seventy-first season for the Canadian National Soccer League. The season concluded on October 17, 1995, with St. Catharines Roma claiming their first CNSL Championship after defeating Toronto Rockets in a two-game series. Toronto Croatia secured their fifth CNSL league cup. 

The season was significant as the Canadian Soccer League (CSL) merged with the National Soccer League (NSL), which renamed the league the Canadian National Soccer League (CNSL). As the Canadian Soccer Association suspended the CSL on April 30, 1993, their remaining clubs joined the CNSL. The new additions included the Winnipeg Fury, which marked the league's first entry into Manitoba, and the reintroduction of a Quebec division making the league operative in three provinces.

Overview   
After the defections of the Toronto Blizzard, and Vancouver 86ers to the American Professional Soccer League the main financial sponsor of the Montreal Supra split with the front office to form another APSL franchise. These actions along with the financial crisis the Canadian Soccer League was experiencing caused the league to merge its interests with the National Soccer League. The merger resulted in a name change to the Canadian National Soccer League with the additions of the North York Rockets (changed to Toronto Rockets), Winnipeg Fury, and the introduction of a Quebec division to house the former Quebec National Soccer League (LNSQ) clubs. As a result of the changes to the Canadian soccer landscape, the Canadian Soccer Association recognized the APSL as the top tier in the country with the intention of designating the CNSL as a secondary league. After a meeting conducted with representatives from both parties, the CNSL failed to receive sanctioning from the CSA. 

On April 30, 1993, the CSA officially suspended the CSL for one season, with the CSL in response sanctioning the CNSL for the 1993 season. Woodbridge Azzuri was suspended after failing to secure a proper facility according to league standards. The executive committee of the league included Laurie McIvor as president, Rocco LoFranco as commissioner, Armando DiFruscio as vice president, and Harry Gauss with Tony Fontana as directors. Winnipeg experienced a tumultuous season in terms of fiscal operations as they struggled in making payments, and even applied to the provincial government for a grant to fulfill their league commitments.

Teams

Coaching changes

Final standings

Eastern Division

Western Division

Playoffs

Final

Individual awards  

The 1993 annual CNSL awards were held at Auberge Universel in Sherbrooke, Quebec with the nominations announced on October 22, 1993. The awards were presented on November 3, 1993, with Montreal Croatia receiving the most accolades. The Golden Boot was shared between Dwayne Dear and Tomasz Radzinski with both finishing with 15 goals in their respective divisions. Radzinski would ultimately play in noted leagues such as the Belgian First Division, and Premier League. Montreal Croatia's Zoran Petkovic was named the MVP and Krunoslav Piperkovic was given the Most Sportsmanlike Award. 

After securing the Eastern division title for Croatia the Coach of the Year went to Simon Demo along with the Team of the Year award. The Montreal Ramblers finished second with three awards with Charlie Mohamed being named the Goalkeeper of the Year, and Paul Daccobert was recognized as the Rookie of the Year and would later play in the USISL Pro League. The Ramblers also received the Most Technical award, while Corfinium St-Leonard received the Most Improved award. The remainder of the awards went to Cosmos de LaSalle as Best Administration and Manuel Sosa was given the Best Referee award.

References

External links
RSSSF CNSL page
thecnsl.com - 1993 season

1993–94 domestic association football leagues
Canadian National Soccer League
1993